Polly Cooper was an Oneida woman from the New York colony who took part in an expedition in 1777 to aid the Continental army during the American Revolution. Troops were camped at Valley Forge, Pennsylvania in winter quarters during 1777–78.

Contributions to the American Revolution 
Cooper and other Oneida natives walked hundreds of miles to carry hundreds of bushels of white corn to the starving Continental Army. She stayed with the Continental Army for a period to teach the soldiers how to prepare the white corn, which needed a different cooking technique for digestion. In addition, she aided with herbal supplements and medical care.

Alliance 
The Oneida Indian Nation  had a friendly relationship with George Washington and his army which important information in order to understand Polly Cooper’s story. The Oneida Indian Nation supported the American cause due to the leadership of the Congregational preacher, Samuel Kirkland and their disdain for the British appointed native superintendents, Sir William Johnson and his son in law Guy Johnson. On April 25th, a group of forty-seven Indian men and Polly Cooper left with Louis de Tousard carrying bushels of corn to assist Washington at Valley Forge.

After the War 
After the war, the Continental Army tried to pay Polly Cooper for her valiant service, but she refused any recompense, stating that it was her duty to help her friends in their time of need. Cooper was gifted a black shawl that she saw on display in a store window. Congress appropriated money for the shawl and it was given to her for her services as a cook for the officers of the army. The shawl is still in the care of the Cooper descendants and is in nearly perfect condition. It has been loaned for display at the Shako:wi, The Oneida Nation Cultural Center.

Legacy 
The Polly Cooper Chapter of the National Society Daughters of the American Revolution is located in Chappaqua, New York. In 2004, the Oneida Indian Nation commissioned a bronze statue by sculptor, Edward Hlavka in order to share the oral tradition of Polly Cooper. The twenty-two foot tall, 2,200 pound monument was gifted to the Smithsonian Institution's National Museum of the American Indian and is displayed on the Oneida floor. In 2005, she was inducted into the Hall of Fame of the Oneida County Historical Society.

References

Glatthaar, Joseph T. and James Kirby Martin.  Forgotten Allies: The Oneida Indians and the American Revolution.  New York: Hill and Wang, 2006.

Oneida people
Native Americans in the American Revolution
Women in the American Revolution
Year of death unknown
Year of birth unknown
Native American women in warfare
People of New York (state) in the American Revolution
18th-century Native American women